The Manchester Geographical Society (founded 1884) is a learned society and a registered charity (No. 1134626) based in Manchester, England.

History
When it was founded, by a group of Manchester businessmen, it was addressed by Sir Henry Morton Stanley, the African explorer. The society's original interest was in commercial and political geography, and it later contributed to creation of the first Lecturership (Henry Yule Oldham) in Geography at Owen’s College, Manchester (1891) and the first Chair in Geography (Herbert John Fleure) at the University of Manchester (1930). The Society’s Museum (1901–73) was later dispersed. 

Notable individuals involved in the Society’s early years have included Spencer, 8th Duke of Devonshire (President 1885–92), George V (President 1892–1936) and Louis Charles Casaertelli. Among the society's founders was Eli Sowerbutts who was its Secretary (1884–1904), whose sons also became Secretary, Harry Sowerbutts (1904–19) and Thomas William Sowerbutts (1919–33). The Society became a registered charity in 1963, and was later incorporated as a Charitable Trust in 2010.

Lunchtime Lecture Series
Throughout its history the Society has organised an annual lecture series providing free public talks on a range of topics from September to June.

Research Fund
The Society’s Research Fund provides North-West England university lecturers with funds for small projects.

Bursaries and Prizes
Each year, the Society provides Bursaries to enable postgraduate Geography Students to attend conferences. It also awards Prizes for the best Geography Undergraduate Finals Performance Students at the University of Manchester.

Journal

The Society’s published journal was The Journal of the Manchester Geographical Society (1885–1960), succeeded by The Manchester Geographer (1960–93) and The North West Geographer (1997–2000). In 2001, it was renamed North West Geography (2001–present) and became a free online journal. The Society has also published an Exploring Greater Manchester series of excursion guides.

Library (and Atlas and Map) and Archive Collections
The Society’s Library (1884–1970) has been on permanent loan to the University of Manchester  Library since 1970: it contains books on Britain (especially North-West England), nineteenth and twentieth century exploration, and travel and geography in Europe, Oceania, Africa, Asia, and the Americas. Its Map Collection (totalling over 2,000) from the eighteenth to twentieth centuries covers Africa, various continents as well as admiralty charts and other ephemera. The Society’s Atlas Collection (on loan to the John Rylands Library, Manchester) dates from 1701. The Society’s Archives (1884–2010) have been deposited at Manchester Archives, Manchester Central Library.

External links

Footnotes

Further reading
University of Manchester and Manchester Geographical Society. Loan Exhibition of Old Maps.--Facsimiles and Reproductions of manuscript maps and globes, early printed maps ... to be held in the Whitworth Hall of the Manchester University ... Catalogue of Exhibits. Manchester, 1923
A Catalogue of the Exhibition of Atlases to Celebrate the Centenary of the Manchester Geographical Society; compiled and arranged by William C. Brice, Brian Paul Hindle. Manchester: John Rylands University Library of Manchester, 1984 
Lloyd, Andrew Manchester Geographical Society Library Catalogue. Manchester: Manchester Geographical Society, 1992
--do.--Early Atlases and Printed Books from the Manchester Geographical Society Collection: a catalogue (in: Bulletin of the John Rylands University Library of Manchester; Vol. 73, no. 2). Manchester: John Rylands University Library of Manchester, 1991
Brown, T. Nigel L. (1971) The History of the Manchester Geographical Society, 1884-1950. Manchester: Manchester University Press  
Leigh, M. D., (1980) "The Manchester Geographical Society, 1884–1979: An Historical Summary", in: The Manchester Geographer; vol. 1(1), pp. 7–14.
Freeman, T. W. (1984) "The Manchester Geographical Society, 1884–1984", in: The Manchester Geographer; vol. 5, pp. 1–12 
Hindle, B. P. (1998) "Turmoil and Transition: The Manchester Geographical Society, 1973–97", in: The North West Geographer; vol. 2(1), pp. .
 Hindle, B. P. (2010) "Continuing Change: The Manchester Geographical Society, 1997–2010", in: The North West Geographer; vol. 10(2), pp. .

Geographic societies
G
Organizations established in 1884
1884 establishments in England
Organisations based in Manchester
 Publications established in 1884
 Annual journals
History of geography journals